Aki Pasinpoika Riihilahti (born 9 September 1976) is a retired Finnish footballer. He is known as a hard working, defensive midfielder. He is now working as the CEO of HJK Helsinki. He was voted by leading European clubs to be the vice-chairman of European Club Association (ECA) and has also important positions both at UEFA (club competition committee) and FIFA (stakeholders committee).

Club career 
Riihilahti started his career at HJK where he made his Veikkausliiga debut in 1995. He has won the Finnish championship four times (1997, 2009, 2010 and 2011), the Finnish Cup three times with HJK, and the Finnish League Cup three times, and played a vital part when the first and so far only time a Finnish Club team qualified for the UEFA Champions League in the 1998–99 season. After his first spell in HJK, Riihilahti moved to Norway's Vålerenga I.F. for the 1999 season.

After two seasons in Norway, he joined England's Crystal Palace in 2001, eventually becoming a fans' favourite at the club. In Palace's 2004–05 Premier League season he showed he has what it takes to play in one of Europe's top leagues. Riihilahti was so loved by the Crystal Palace faithful that a Finnish flag with the legend 'AKI 15' across the centre was hung behind one of the Selhurst Park goals for the entire Premier League season. However, his next season, back in the Championship, following Palace's relegation, was not so successful because injuries limited his chances. Despite not playing for most of his last season with Palace, Riihilahti has a place in the club Hall of Fame as he held the club record for gaining the most caps for his country whilst at Palace.

After his contract with Palace expired in the summer of 2006, Riihilahti was picked up by 1. FC Kaiserslautern on a one-year deal. In June 2007, Riihilahti signed a two and a half-year deal with Stockholm club Djurgårdens IF and on 31 July 2009 returned to Finland to sign with HJK in which he has made a crucial contribution in the club's record 5 consecutive championships 2009–2013. On 29 October 2011, Riihilahti celebrated his 100th league match for HJK by scoring once, in the last match of the season, in a 5–2 home win against Haka, and retired after the club won a convincing double that season.

Riihilahti was appointed and did a good turnaround job for HJK's home stadium as the CEO of Bolt Arena. In December 2013 he was appointed as the CEO of HJK.

International career 
Riihilahti made his debut for the Finnish national team on 5 February 1998 against Cyprus. He was a regular for Finland for most of the 2000s, and earned 69 caps scoring 11 goals.
He is part of the Finnish Golden generation in football, but mainly due to his work as football director at International level he has become one of the most well-known Finnish football person.

Personal life 
Riihilahti has also become something of a cult figure because of columns he writes for newspapers, such as The Times and the Finnish Iltalehti. 
He has also been involved in many good charity projects like ’'Icehearts and ’'Peace United. Apart from his careers in sports and media he has been involved in many high profile political and business committees.
Riihilahti divorced 2019 and is a father of two children.

Honours

HJK Helsinki 
 Veikkausliiga: 1997, 2009, 2010, 2011
 Finnish Cup: 1996, 1998, 2011
 Finnish League Cup: 1996, 1997, 1998

Crystal Palace 
 English First Division play-offs: 2004

External links 

 
 Aki Riihilahti at Veikkausliiga.com 
 
 

1976 births
Living people
Footballers from Helsinki
Finnish footballers
Finland international footballers
Association football midfielders
Helsingin Jalkapalloklubi players
Vålerenga Fotball players
Crystal Palace F.C. players
1. FC Kaiserslautern players
Djurgårdens IF Fotboll players
Veikkausliiga players
Eliteserien players
Premier League players
English Football League players
2. Bundesliga players
Allsvenskan players
Expatriate footballers in England
Finnish expatriate sportspeople in England
Expatriate footballers in Germany
Finnish expatriate sportspeople in Germany
Expatriate footballers in Sweden
Finnish expatriate sportspeople in Sweden
Expatriate footballers in Norway
Finnish expatriate sportspeople in Norway
Finnish expatriate footballers